Manbazar is a census town in Manbazar I CD block in Manbazar subdivision of Purulia district in the state of West Bengal, India. The headquarters of Manbazar subdivision are located in Manbazar.

Geography

Location

Area overview
Purulia district forms the lowest step of the Chota Nagpur Plateau. The general scenario is undulating land with scattered hills. Manbazar subdivision, shown in the map alongside, is located in the eastern part of the district. It is an overwhelmingly rural subdivision with 96.32% of the population living in the rural areas and 3.68% living in the urban areas. There are 3 census towns in the subdivision. The map shows the Kangsabati Project Reservoir. The Mukutmanipur Dam is in Bankura district but the upper portion of the reservoir is in Manbazar subdivision. The remnants of old temples and deities are found in the subdivision also, as in other parts of the district. The subdivision has a very high proportion of Scheduled Castes and Scheduled Tribes. Bandwan CD block has 51.86% ST population, Manbazar II CD block has 48.97% ST population. Manbazar I CD block has 22.03% ST and 22.44% SC. Puncha CD block has 24.74% ST and 14.54 SC. Writing in 1911, H. Coupland, ICS, speaks of the aboriginal races largely predominating in the old Manbhum district. He particularly mentions the Kurmis, Santhals, Bhumij and Bauri.

Note: The map alongside presents some of the notable locations in the subdivision. All places marked in the map are linked in the larger full screen map.

Demographics
As per 2011 Census of India Manbazar town had a total population of 9,521 of which 4,867 (51%) were males and 4,654 (49%) were females. Population below 6 years was 1,007. The total number of literates in Manbazar was 6,948 (81.61% of the population over 6 years).

Civic administration

Police station
Manbazar police station has jurisdiction over a part of the Manbazar I CD block. The area covered is 411.11 km2 and the population covered is 153,985.

CD block HQ
The headquarters of the Manbazar I CD block are located at Manbazar.

Transport
SH 4 running from Jhalda (in Purulia district) to Digha (in Purba Medinipur district) and SH 5 running from Rupnarayanpur (in Bardhaman district) to Junput (in Purba Medinipur district) cross at Manbazar. SBSTC has a bus depot at Manbazar.

Education
Manbhum Mahavidyalaya at Manbazar is affiliated to Sidho Kanho Birsha University. It offers courses in B.Sc. (Hons) in Economics and Computer Science, B.Sc. (General), B.Com (Hons), B.Com (General), B.A. (Hons) in Bengali, English, Santali, History, Geography and Economics, B.A. (General), B.B.A. (Hons).

Healthcare
Manbazar Rural Hospital, with 40 beds, is a major government medical facility in Manbazar I CD block.

References

Cities and towns in Purulia district